Pablo Enrique Hernández López (12 February 1940 – 1 January 2021) was a Colombian cyclist. He competed in the individual road race and team time trial events at the 1964 Summer Olympics. Hernández died on 1 January 2021, at the age of 80.

References

External links

1940 births
2021 deaths
Colombian male cyclists
Olympic cyclists of Colombia
Cyclists at the 1964 Summer Olympics
People from Cundinamarca Department
20th-century Colombian people
21st-century Colombian people